Rashtriya Jan Jan Party is a registered political party by Election Commission of India. Ashutosh Kumar is the National president of this party. Bhumihar Brahman Ekta Manch is the mother organisation of RJJP. Rashtriya Jan Jan Party shall be contesting Bihar assembly elections 2020. In a press conference organised in Patna, Ashutosh said that Rashtriya Jan Jan Party has been formed to achieve golden dream of Bihar through industrial development. On 18 July 2021 party done meeting with party supporters to spread party views in Bihar. They clear their stand that they will stand with all communities or caste. They also share the slogan "HAREEK BOOTH WITH FIVE YOUTH".

History

Its main ideology is for anti-reservation. It has been a vocal in demanding EWS reservation.

Activities

The party has also been indulged in the relief work of migrants and flood victims. The party has also been conducting membership drives in last two month.

Bihar Assembly Elections 2020

Rashtriya Jan Jan Party contested almost all those assembly seats having forward caste dominant population.

References

Political parties in India
Political parties established in 2019
2019 establishments in India